Fincorp was an Australian property and investment company that collapsed in March 2007. The company promised investors a return of up to 9.25% p.a., but, upon collapse, owed around 8000 investors over A$200 million.

References

External links
 Fincorp's homepages

Defunct investment companies of Australia